Keryneia is a village and a community in the municipal unit of Diakopto, Achaea, Greece. The community consists of the villages Keryneia and Nea Keryneia. It is located 6 km southeast of Aigio and 7 km west of Diakopto.  The Greek National Road 8A (Patras - Aigio - Corinth) passes between Keryneia and Nea Keryneia. In 2011 Keryneia had a population of 35 for the village and 362 for the community. The town takes its name from the ancient town of Ceryneia

Population

History

Ceryneia was one of the twelve towns of the ancient Achaeans. The city Kyrenia in Cyprus was settled by Achaeans, probably from Ceryneia.

People

Margos, (c. 300-229 BC) strategos and navarch of the Achaean League

See also
List of settlements in Achaea
Ceryneian Hind

References

External links
 Keryneia GTP Travel Pages

Aigialeia
Diakopto
Populated places in Achaea